Timothy Goes to School is a children's animated television series based on books written by Rosemary Wells, but is titled after the book of the same name. The series is a co-production with Nelvana Limited and Animation Services (Hong Kong) Limited, in association with Silver Lining Entertainment Ltd. and produced in association with PBS and TVOntario with the participation of Knowledge Network, Access and Saskatchewan Communications Network.

The show premiered on September 30, 2000, and aired its final episode on January 26, 2002. The show aired on PBS Kids as part of the PBS Kids Bookworm Bunch block from 2000 until 2004.

Premise
Timothy Goes to School primarily focuses on a young enthusiastic anthropomorphic raccoon named Timothy (voiced by Austin Di Iulio), who attends kindergarten at a fictional place called "Hilltop School" along with ten other students (each of which are of different animals except for the Frank Twins and Claude). The kindergarten class is taught by Mrs. Jenkins, a comforting teacher who enjoys educating and helping her students.

Characters
Below are the characters split up into three groups, children, adults, and others.

A majority of the characters were taken from the Yoko and Friends: School Days book series, alongside other Rosemary Wells stories such as Shy Charles, Fritz and the Mess Fairy, and Noisy Nora.

Children
 Timothy (voiced by Austin Di Iulio) is a raccoon. Although he is the main character of the show, not all episodes are centered on him. He is a well-meaning young boy, generally trying to be a friend to everyone. Occasionally, he can be impulsive. He wears a blue and white striped shirt, although he wore blue overalls on his first day at school and a red jacket on his second day.
 Yoko (voiced by Lisa Yamanaka) is a friendly gray tabby cat originally from Japan who is typically sweet and is the most warm-hearted child in the school. She plays the violin well and sees the best in people. Yoko enjoys different aspects of Japanese culture, including sushi and origami, which has occasionally caused problems for her and her classmates. She is Timothy's best friend and they are often seen together. She wears a yellow dress with a red cardigan. She's nicknamed "little cherry blossom" by her mother.
 Nora (voiced by Alyson Court) is a Bole-brown mouse who is sometimes bossy and sulky. She is known for making a lot of noise which has earned her the nickname Noisy Nora. She owns a lizard called Norman who lives in the school. She has an eight-year-old sister, who is in 3rd grade, named Kate who has not appeared in the show other than as a picture Nora drew of her in "My Family", and a fully messy baby brother named Jack who occasionally appears. She wears a purple dress.
 Charles (voiced by Max Morrow) is a gray mouse who likes to play by himself at recess but is often seen around Timothy, Lilly or Yoko, being the quieter members of the class. He engages in very creative and imaginative play, such as building a make-believe rocket. He has expressed shyness strongly in "Shy Charles", both at school and at home. As he is the smallest member of the class, paired with Nora, he tends to not be good at sports, but he is not annoyed by this. He wears a red shirt and blue overalls.
 Lilly (voiced by Mag Ruffman) is a fox who is forgetful and sometimes scatterbrained, and she often ties a string around a finger in order to remedy this. Lilly has a pet goldfish named Treasure. She is generally extremely absent-minded, but she remembers the most vital things. Her forgetfulness can often be a source of annoyance to the other characters, but they quickly forgive her. She wears a sea green skirt with an orange shirt and a pair of red tennis shoes.
 Frank #1 & Frank #2 (voiced by Darren Frost and Rob Stefaniuk respectively) are French Bulldog twin brothers who love sports and often speak in unison. The brothers speak in stilted, dull voices which suggest they are not particularly intelligent. They are known for fighting, telling jokes, and trying to do their things simultaneously with their trademark happy laughter. They are unable to stand being separated (as shown in the ‘Frankless Frank’ episode) and can sometimes be slightly reckless. Their favorite food is franks and beans. Frank #1 is black and wears a blue jersey, whereas Frank #2 is orange and wears a green jersey.
 Doris (voiced by Tracy Leah Ryan) is a beaver who is a boisterous tomboy. She is a talented soccer player who seems to have a fear of insects and spiders. Doris has three older brothers: Morris, Horace, and Boris. Doris is clearly the tallest student in her class, though at home, she is teased by her brothers as she is much smaller than they are. Doris appears to be the most avant-garde artist in class, as she believes her abstract art should never looked like anything else, as long as it makes her happy. Most of the other characters are impressed by her size and strength. She can sometimes be mean, intentionally or not. She wears a pink dress with a darker pink bow in her hair.
 Fritz (voiced by Laurie Elliott) is a skunk who is very fond of science and is another one of Timothy's best friends. He leaves for another school in "Fritz on the Move" and returns soon after in "Many Happy Returns" after his mother got a new job. Fritz is also the most clever in the class, and occasionally knows more than the teacher about a particular subject. Fritz reacts badly to the failure in his experiments and also has a tendency towards messiness. He originally wore a yellow shirt with a green necktie, but, upon returning in "Many Happy Returns", his tie is replaced by a green multi-pocketed vest.
 Claude (voiced by Joanne Vannicola) is a raccoon who tries to be the best in the school but comes off arrogantly in some cases. Because of this, there is some rivalry between him and Timothy. However, they appear to become good friends after Timothy secretly teaches Claude to swim, after which Claude credits Timothy. He wears a dark green polo shirt and is most often seen with Grace.
 Grace (voiced by Linda Kash) is an upper-class ginger Persian cat who likes things her way. Her interests include dance, especially ballet, and figure skating. She has a quick temper and gets quickly annoyed when mistakes are made and silly questions are asked from the other people in the class. She is seen playing with Claude most of the time. She wears a bright blue dress.
 Juanita (voiced by Susan Laney Dalton) is a tuxedo cat originally from Mexico who only appears in the last two episodes (the last two episodes from Season 2; the second and final season); "Mama Don't Go" and "Making New Friends". Upon joining the school, she is very nervous, anxious, and feels insecure without her mother, but she finally overcomes her nerves. A new pupil to the school, she sees the best in people like Yoko. She has a doll named María and a gecko named Pablo.

Adults
 Mrs. Jenkins (voiced by Fiona Reid) is a fox and the kindergarten class's teacher. Her name was Miss Abercrombie before she married Mr. Jenkins as she was mentioned in the episode "Just in Time". She can play the piano well, sing songs and enjoys birdwatching as a hobby. She wears a green coat over a purple dress and a pair of glasses with red rims.
 Big Frank (voiced by Neil Crone) is a French bulldog and the single father of the Frank twins. He speaks in a gentle voice and is very kind, a great dad and encourages his sons. He is seen as good with the machinery and repairs, as he is easily able to fix Timothy's bicycle in "Red Thunder". He also helps the Franks fix Yoko's taketombo after they accidentally break it. He wears a blue work shirt. The case whether Big Frank is divorced or a widower is left unknown, as the whereabouts of his wife/the twins' mother is ambiguous.
 Henry (voiced by Jamie Watson) is a beaver. He is a cheerful janitor and bus driver. He wears a blue uniform and was once the student of Mrs. Jenkins back when she was called Miss Abercrombie. Despite his appearance, he is not that old. In "Just in Time", he told the class he attended kindergarten 25 years ago, suggesting he is 30 years old (born 1972).
 Miss Appleberry is a skunk and a student teacher at Hilltop School who is very cheerful and is sometimes seen with Mrs. Jenkins, mostly on school trips. She usually wears a blue dress. When Mrs. Jenkins sprained her arm in "Get Well Soon", she was the substitute teacher.
 Mrs. Lightfoot is a mouse and the librarian who gives the children their first library cards. She only appears in "Read Me a Story".

Others
There are several notable adults and relatives, though many only appear in a couple of episodes (Yoko's mother, Doris' brothers, Nora's baby brother Jack, Charles' Auntie Bea, and the other children's parents). Yoko, Fritz, and Lilly do not appear to have their fathers while the Franks and Claude do not appear to have a mother, however, these situations are never stated in the show.

Episodes

Season 1 (2000)

Season 2 (2001–02)

Telecast
Timothy Goes to School was first premiered on September 30, 2000, and aired its final episode on January 26, 2002. The show aired on PBS Kids as part of the PBS Kids Bookworm Bunch block from 2000 until 2004. The show was aired in the U.S. on the channels PBS Kids, Discovery Kids, and Qubo.

In Canada, the show has aired on various Canadian television stations, with reruns later airing on Treehouse TV.

In foreign countries, the show also aired on the United Kingdom's digital TV channel Tiny Pop,
Israel on Hop! under the Hebrew title "טימותי הולך לבית הספר", in the Middle East on Almajd TV Network, and in Latin America on ZAZ. In Brazil, the show was aired on TV Cultura in 2003 until 2007. 

As of 2022, the show is now streaming on Tubi.

Home Media
In the mid-2000s, KaBoom! Entertainment has released several DVD releases of the series in Canada.

A DVD titled "Lessons Learned" was released by the US distributor FUNimation Entertainment in 2004, under the Our Time Family Entertainment imprint.

A DVD of the series was released in the United Kingdom by Maverick Entertainment in 2004. Two more DVDs titled "New Friends" and "When I Grow Up" were released by FremantleMedia in 2008 and 2009.

References

External links

 

2000s Canadian animated television series
2000s Canadian children's television series
2000 Canadian television series debuts
2002 Canadian television series endings
Canadian children's animated comedy television series
Canadian children's animated drama television series
Canadian television shows based on children's books
Canadian preschool education television series
Animated preschool education television series
2000s preschool education television series
Elementary school television series
English-language television shows
Early childhood education in the United States
PBS Kids shows
Treehouse TV original programming
TVO original programming
Television series by Nelvana
Television series about raccoons
Animated television series about cats
Animated television series about dogs
Animated television series about foxes
Animated television series about mice and rats
Animated television series about children